Jhulelal may refer to:

Jhulelal (Hinduism), the Hindu water deity
Jhulelal (Sufism), a title of Lal Shahbaz Qalandar (1177–1275), Muslim mystic of the Suhrawardy Sufi order